Elvis Kofi Okyere Wiafe Manu (born 13 August 1993) is a Dutch professional footballer who plays as a winger for Groningen on loan from the Bulgarian First League side Botev Plovdiv.

Manu has represented the Netherlands from the U16 through to the U21 age group. However, on 24 June 2015, he switched his national allegiance to Ghana, whom he qualifies for through his Ghanaian heritage.

Club career

Feyenoord
After progressing through Feyenoord's youth academy, Manu signed a professional contract with the club in 2012. Manu made his professional debut for Feyenoord on 26 February 2012, in a 2–3 away defeat to PSV, coming on for Jerson Cabral in the 90th minute. He scored his first professional goal for the club in a 2–3 away victory to Heerenveen, in Feyenoord's final game of the 2011–12 season.

Loan spells
After making his first appearances for Feyenoord during the 2011–12 season, Manu was loaned out to Eerste Divisie side Excelsior at the start of the 2012–13 campaign, along with 4 other Feyenoord players.

After returning to Feyenoord at the beginning of 2013–14 season, Manu was loaned out once again on 9 January 2014, joining Eredivise side SC Cambuur until the end of the season.

Feyenoord first team
After spending most of the previous two seasons out on loan, Manu broke into the Feyenoord first team during the 2014–15 season, becoming a regular for the club. Manu was on the bench in Feyenoord's first game of the 2014–15 season, a 1–2 defeat at home to Beşiktaş in the Champions League third qualifying round, Manu came on in the 65th minute for Wesley Verhoek to make his European debut. His first goal of the season came on 6 August 2014, on the return leg to Beşiktaş just seven days later, his goal came in the 74th minute, however he was unable to prevent Beşiktaş triumphing 5–2 on aggregate.

Feyenoord were thus knocked of the Champions League and demoted to the Europa League. In the Europa League play-off round, against Zorya Luhansk, Manu scored in the 90th minute to put Feyenoord 4–3 ahead and send them into the Europa League group stage for the first time in six years. Feyenoord went on to win their group, with Manu scoring in both of the matches against Standard Liège. In the knockout stages, Feyenoord faced Roma, with Manu scoring in the return leg, however Feyenoord lost 2–3 on aggregate. Manu went on to make 35 appearances and score 12 goals in all competitions for Feyenoord during the 2014–15 season.

Brighton and Hove Albion
On 29 August 2015, Manu joined Championship club Brighton & Hove Albion for an undisclosed fee. He made his Brighton debut in a 0–0 draw, away to Wolverhampton Wanderers on 19 September 2015, coming on at half-time for Tomer Hemed. He returned from his Huddersfield Town loan on 9 August 2016. In his first game for Brighton after the conclusion of his loan spell, Manu scored his first goal for the club in a 4–0 League Cup victory at home to Colchester United. Manu also scored for Brighton in his second appearance for the club in the 2016–17 season, a 2–4 League Cup victory over Oxford United.

Huddersfield Town (loan)
On 1 February 2016, Manu joined Championship club Huddersfield Town on loan until 2 May 2016. He made his Huddersfield debut as a substitute in a 2–1 defeat against Preston North End on 6 February 2016, coming on in the 78th minute for Harry Bunn.

Manu was recalled from his loan spell at Huddersfield on 30 March 2016, after he found his chances limited at the club.

Go Ahead Eagles (loan)
On 31 December 2016, Manu joined Eredivisie side Go Ahead Eagles on loan for the remainder of the 2016–17 season. On 8 May 2017, Go Ahead Eagles announced that the club has decided to end the loan of Manu prematurely due to unprofessional behavior before the game with Ajax, which was lost by 4 – 0 the day before the announcement.

Gençlerbirliği
On 10 July 2017, Manu joined Turkish side Gençlerbirliği on a two-year contract.

Akhisarspor
In July 2018, Manu signed for Akhisarspor. He made his debut in the 2018 Turkish Super Cup against Galatasaray.

Beijing Renhe
In July 2019, Manu joined Chinese Super League side Beijing Renhe.

Ludogorets Razgrad
In August 2020, Manu signed a contract with Bulgarian champions Ludogorets Razgrad. On 29 October 2020, he scored three goals in the 3:4 away loss to Austrian side LASK in a UEFA Europa League match.

Wisła Kraków
On 28 February 2022, Manu joined Polish Ekstraklasa side Wisła Kraków until the end of the season with a one-year extension option.

Botev Plovdiv
In August 2022, Manu returned to Bulgaria, signing a two-year contract with Botev Plovdiv.

Groningen (loan)
On 31 January 2023, he was loaned out to Dutch club Groningen until the end of the season.

International career
Manu has represented the Netherlands in the U16, U17, U19, U20 and U21 levels. However, on 24 June 2015, he switched his national allegiance to Ghana, whom he qualifies for through his Ghanaian heritage. He is yet to play for their national team.

Career statistics
.

Honours
Akhisarspor
 Turkish Super Cup: 2018

References

External links
 
 Elvis Manu Player Profile on the Brighton & Hove Albion website
 Elvis Manu Interview

1993 births
Living people
Footballers from Dordrecht
Dutch footballers
Dutch people of Ghanaian descent
Netherlands youth international footballers
Netherlands under-21 international footballers
Association football wingers
Feyenoord players
Excelsior Rotterdam players
SC Cambuur players
Brighton & Hove Albion F.C. players
Huddersfield Town A.F.C. players
Go Ahead Eagles players
Gençlerbirliği S.K. footballers
Akhisarspor footballers
Beijing Renhe F.C. players
PFC Ludogorets Razgrad players
Wisła Kraków players
Botev Plovdiv players
FC Groningen players
Eredivisie players
Eerste Divisie players
English Football League players
Süper Lig players
Chinese Super League players
First Professional Football League (Bulgaria) players
Ekstraklasa players
Dutch expatriate footballers
Dutch expatriate sportspeople in England
Dutch expatriate sportspeople in Turkey
Dutch expatriate sportspeople in China
Dutch expatriate sportspeople in Bulgaria
Dutch expatriate sportspeople in Poland
Expatriate footballers in England
Expatriate footballers in Turkey
Expatriate footballers in China
Expatriate footballers in Bulgaria
Expatriate footballers in Poland